The Anthony de Mello Trophy is awarded to the winner of the England-India Test cricket series held in India. The trophy was instituted in 1951, when England toured India for a five-match series. The trophy is named after Anthony de Mello, an Indian cricket administrator and one of the founders of the Board of Control for Cricket in India (BCCI).

When the series is held in England, the England-India Test cricket series is played for the Pataudi Trophy. That trophy was instituted by the Marylebone Cricket Club (MCC) in 2007 to mark the 75th anniversary of the first England-India Test series held in England in 1932. The trophy was named after the Pataudi cricketing family. In 2012, the Pataudi family requested to make the Pataudi Trophy the winner's prize in India as well as England. However, the BCCI said it would not rename the trophy awarded in India.

In 2012, England won the Anthony De Mello Trophy. It was England's first series win in India since 1984–85, India won the series 3–1 in 2020–21 thus qualifying for the 2019–21 ICC World Test Championship final.

Results

See also
Border-Gavaskar Trophy
Pataudi Trophy
Freedom Trophy (cricket)

References

Test cricket competitions
India in international cricket
England in international cricket
International cricket competitions in India
Cricket awards and rankings